Arthur Byron Cover (born January 14, 1950, in Grundy, Virginia) is an American  science fiction author.

Cover attended the Clarion Writer's SF Workshop in New Orleans in 1971, and made his first professional short-story sale to Harlan Ellison's The Last Dangerous Visions.

Cover's short stories have appeared in Infinity Five, Alternities, The Alien Condition, Weird Heroes #6, The Year's Best Horror #4 and #5, Wild Cards #5: Down & Dirty, and Pulphouse. He has also written several comic books, including two issues of Daredevil (one of them with Ellison), and Space Clusters, a graphic novel from DC Comics illustrated by Alex Niño — plus several animation scripts, and reviews and articles for such august publications as The New York Review of Science Fiction.

Cover's first novel, Autumn Angels, was the second of Harlan Ellison's Discovery Series of new authors for Pyramid Books, and was nominated for a Nebula Award. The novel has been described as "a stylistic cross-breed of Ellison and Vonnegut, and as such both predates and bests Douglas Adams in creating a comic, literary fantasy."

Cover currently manages the "Dangerous Visions" science fiction book sales website. The website takes its name from the  Dangerous Visions anthology edited in 1967 by Harlan Ellison. Cover was also a judge for the 2005 Philip K. Dick Award.

Bibliography

Buffyverse

 Night of the Living Rerun (1998)

Other works

 Autumn Angels (1975)
 The Platypus of Doom and Other Nihilists (1976) — a collection of 4 novelettes:
"The Platypus of Doom"
"The Armadillo of Destruction"
"The Aardvark of Despair"
"The Clam of Catastrophe"
 The Sound of Winter (Pyramid Books, 1976)
 An East Wind Coming (1979) — from the cover: ""An immortal Sherlock Holmes: a deathless Jack the Ripper! in a fantasy duel through the corridors of time."
 Flash Gordon (1980) — novelization of the screenplay by Michael Allin and Lorenzo Semple Jr.
 Time Machine
 The Rings of Saturn (No. 6)
 American Revolutionary (No. 10)
 Blade of the Guillotine (No. 14, 1986)
 Space Clusters (1986)
 Planetfall (1988)
 Isaac Asimov's Robot City: Prodigy (#4, 1988)
 Stationfall (1989)
The Rising Stars Trilogy (2002-2005) - Based on the comic book series by J. Michael Straczynski
"Rising Stars Book 1: Born In Fire" (2002)
"Rising Stars Book 2: Ten Years After" (2002)
"Rising Stars Book 3: Change the World" (2005)
 The Red Star (2003)

Television credits
 The Transformers (1986)
 Defenders of the Earth (1986)
 Bionic Six (1987)
 Spiral Zone (1987)
 Dinosaucers (1987)
 Starcom: The U.S. Space Force (1987)
 The Real Ghostbusters (1987)
 Transformers: Generation 2 (1993)
 Phantom 2040'' (1995)

References

External links
 
 Dangerous Visions site
Review of Autumn Angels
ABC interviews Philip K. Dick

1950 births
Living people
American science fiction writers
20th-century American novelists
21st-century American novelists
American male novelists
20th-century American male writers
21st-century American male writers
Novelists from Virginia
People from Grundy, Virginia